Mead Memorial Chapel is a historic Episcopal chapel at 2 Chapel Road in the hamlet of Waccabuc, town of Lewisboro, Westchester County, New York.  It was designed by Hobart B. Upjohn (1876-1949) and built in 1905–1906 in a late Gothic Revival style. It is a rectangular stone building with a steep slate roof.  A wing was added in 1929, known as Mead Memorial Hall, and it houses the Mead family archives.  It features a bell tower pierced by Gothic arch shaped louvered windows.  It was built by Sarah Frances Studwell Mead as a memorial to her husband, George Washington Mead (1827-1899). The Mead family also owned the separately listed The Homestead.

It was added to the National Register of Historic Places in 1999.

See also
National Register of Historic Places listings in northern Westchester County, New York

References

Episcopal church buildings in New York (state)
Properties of religious function on the National Register of Historic Places in New York (state)
National Register of Historic Places in Westchester County, New York
Gothic Revival church buildings in New York (state)
Churches completed in 1905
20th-century Episcopal church buildings
Churches in Westchester County, New York
1905 establishments in New York (state)